Bronte Woodard (October 8, 1940 – August 6, 1980) was an American writer best known for penning the adapted screenplay for the hit film Grease.  Born in Alabama, he also co-wrote the screenplay for the 1980 Village People film Can't Stop the Music with Grease producer Allan Carr.  He also wrote a novel, Meet Me at the Melba.

Biography
Raised in Atlanta, he died of hepatitis-related liver failure at the age of 39 on August 6, 1980 in Los Angeles, California.

Announced unrealized projects
In 1976, Universal Studios announced plans to make a film of Anne Rivers Siddons' novel Heartbreak Hotel for which Woodard would write the screenplay. However, the novel was not actually filmed until several years after Woodard's death, reaching the screen under the title Heart of Dixie in 1989 with a screenplay by Tom McCown instead of Woodard.

References

External links

1940 births
1980 deaths
Screenwriters from Alabama
American male screenwriters
Deaths from hepatitis
20th-century American male writers
20th-century American screenwriters